Mark Luzerne Tidd (born May 8, 1955) is a former United States Navy officer who served as the 25th Chief of Chaplains of the United States Navy from 2010 to 2014.

Early life and education
Tidd comes from a career navy family; his father, Emmett H. Tidd was a vice admiral during the Vietnam War and was the commander of all naval surface forces in the Pacific. His brother, Admiral Kurt W. Tidd, was the commander of all United States forces in South America. He is a 1977 graduate of Williams College in Williamstown, Massachusetts.

Tidd, a Presbyterian minister, received his Master of Divinity from Fuller Theological Seminary, a Master of Theology from Princeton Theological Seminary and a Doctor of Ministry from Pittsburgh Theological Seminary in 2018. He is a graduate of the National War College in Washington, D.C., with a Master of Science in National Security Strategy and a graduate of the Marine Corps Command and Staff College and the Armed Forces Staff College.

Naval career
During his time on board, Reeves visited Qingdao, China, as part of the first port visit by United States warships to China in 39 years. He went on to serve as deputy command chaplain aboard .

Marine Corps tours include 3rd Battalion, 2nd Marines, and the division staff of 2nd Marine Division, Camp Lejeune, North Carolina, deploying to Southwest Asia in support of Operation Desert Storm. He served at Marine Corps Combat Development Command as the chaplain for the Marine Corps Brig and the Base Security Battalion and later returned to 2nd Marine Division as the division chaplain.

Tidd served in leadership positions on the chief of Chaplain’s staff as the branch head for Professional Development and Religious Programs and as the Advanced Training officer at Navy Chaplain School. Tidd was assigned as the force chaplain for United States Naval Forces Central Command and the fleet chaplain for United States Fifth Fleet, headquartered in the Kingdom of Bahrain. After serving as command chaplain for the United States European Command, he became deputy chief of Navy Chaplains and Chaplain of the Marine Corps.

Chief of Navy Chaplains
Tidd assumed his duties as the 25th Chief of Chaplains of the United States Navy on August 27, 2010. He retired on August 1, 2014.

On April 13, 2011, Tidd issued a two-page "guidance" memo stating that following final repeal of don't ask, don't tell, the law barring openly gay people from military service, same-sex couples would be allowed to marry in Naval facilities with Naval chaplains officiating in those states in which same-sex marriage is legal. Following political pressure from Republican members of Congress who claimed that allowing the use of federal facilities or personnel to perform same-sex marriages would violate the Defense of Marriage Act, Tidd suspended the policy on May 10, pending further Naval review.

Awards and decorations

See also

Armed Forces Chaplains Board

References

1955 births
Living people
Williams College alumni
Fuller Theological Seminary alumni
Presbyterian Church (USA) teaching elders
United States Navy chaplains
Princeton Theological Seminary alumni
National War College alumni
Recipients of the Legion of Merit
Recipients of the Defense Superior Service Medal
Joint Forces Staff College alumni
United States Navy admirals
Chaplains of the United States Marine Corps
Chiefs of Chaplains of the United States Navy
Pittsburgh Theological Seminary alumni